Ronan Burke (born 3 June 1990) is an Irish hurler who currently plays as a full-back for the Galway senior team.

On 3 September 2017, Burke was a non playing substitute for Galway as they won their first All-Ireland Senior Hurling Championship in 29 years against Waterford.

References

1990 births
Living people
Turloughmore hurlers
Corofin Gaelic footballers
Galway inter-county hurlers